Apatura metis, the Freyer's purple emperor, is a species of butterfly found in Eurasia.

Appearance
Freyer's purple emperor has dark wings with reddish and yellow bands. The wings of the male are bluish purple if seen from the right angle.

Systematics
Freyer's purple emperor belongs to the genus Apatura, subfamily Apaturinae.  The species is divided into seven subspecies:
 Apatura metis metis (Freyer, 1829) (south-eastern Europe)
 Apatura metis bunea (Herrich-Schäffer, 1845) (south-European Russia, Caucasus)
 Apatura metis substituta (Butler, 1873) (Japan)
 Apatura metis irtyshika (Korshunov, 1982) (south-western Siberia, Kazakhstan)
 Apatura metis separata (Tuzov, 2000) (Transbaikalia)
 Apatura metis heijona (Matsumura, 1928) (Korea, Amur and Ussuri regions)
 Apatura metis doii (Matsumura, 1928) (Kurile islands)

Habitat and ecology
Freyer's purple emperor usually inhabits forests and is often found nearby rivers and streams. The female spends the majority of her life in the foliage. The largest habitat of the animal is the Gemenc forest in southern Hungary.  Although it is one of the rarest animals in Europe, it can be seen in large quantities there. In Europe, Freyer's purple emperor usually has one, sometimes two generations, the first in May and June, the second in July and August.  The caterpillars feed on willow species.

This species is stoutly protected in Europe. The nominal worth of a single specimen is HUF50,000, which equals about US$238.

Gallery

References

Apaturinae
Butterflies of Europe
Butterflies of Asia